Rio Maholtra (born 28 December 1993) is an Indonesian athlete specialising in the sprint hurdles. He represented his country at the 2018 World Indoor Championships without advancing from the first round.

His personal bests are 14.02 seconds in the 110 metres hurdles (-0.5 m/s, Jakarta 2018) and 7.98 seconds in the 60 metres hurdles (Birmingham 2018). Both are current national records.

International competitions

1Did not finish in the final

References

1993 births
Living people
Indonesian male hurdlers
Athletes (track and field) at the 2018 Asian Games
Asian Games competitors for Indonesia
21st-century Indonesian people